"Real to Me" can refer to two songs:
"Real to Me" (Brian McFadden song), a 2004 song by Irish singer Brian McFadden
"Real to Me" (Lydia Denker song), a 2000 song by Australian singer Lydia Denker